Rockin' Around the Christmas Tree is a Christmas album by Arvingarna and was released on 28 November 2007. The album was produced by Gert Lengstrand, who together with Lasse Holm wrote the final track "Det lyser en stjärna", and Mats "MP" Persson from Gyllene Tider. The album charted for four weeks on the Swedish Albums Chart, peaking at number 42 in week 49 of 2007.

Track listing
Rockin' Around the Christmas Tree
Please Come Home for Christmas
Jingle Bell Rock
I Saw Mommy Kissing Santa Claus
Santa Claus is Coming to Town
Walking in My Winter Wonderland
White Christmas
Rudolph the Rednosed Reindeer
Christmas [Baby Please Come Home]
Merry Christmas Baby
Oh Holy Night
Det lyser en stjärna

Charts

References 

Arvingarna albums
2007 Christmas albums
Christmas albums by Swedish artists
Pop Christmas albums